The 1984 Annandale and Eskdale District Council election was the fourth election to Annandale and Eskdale District Council. The district council was the lower tier of local government in the area, below Dumfries and Galloway Regional Council.

This was the first election to Annandale and Eskdale District council where political parties fielded candidates, although the Conservatives didn't. A total of 11 seats were contested, which is a significant increase from last election where only 3 were contested.

Results by ward

References

Annandale
Dumfries and Galloway Council elections